is a Japanese garden attached to a former Shimazu clan residence in Kagoshima, Kagoshima Prefecture, Japan. Designated a Place of Scenic Beauty, together with the adjacent Shōko Shūseikan it forms part of the UNESCO World Heritage Site Sites of Japan’s Meiji Industrial Revolution: Iron and Steel, Shipbuilding and Coal Mining. Sengan-en is managed by Shimadzu Ltd.

History
The name is derived from a supposed resemblance to an eponymous feature on Long Hu Shan. In 1736  added a  water feature and moso bamboo, obtained from China via the Ryūkyū Kingdom. During the Bakumatsu and Meiji periods, the residence housed visiting dignitaries including Katsu Kaishū, Willem Huyssen van Kattendijke, and Pompe van Meerdervoort in 1858, Harry Smith Parkes in 1866, Tsesarevich Nicholas Alexandrovich and Prince George of Greece in 1891, and the Duke of Connaught and Strathearn in 1906, and Edward VIII in 1922.

Gardens
The gardens incorporate the view of Sakurajima across Kagoshima Bay as borrowed scenery.

See also

 List of Places of Scenic Beauty of Japan (Kagoshima)
 List of World Heritage Sites in Japan

References

External links

  Sengan-en and Shoko Shuseikan
  Map of Sengan-en
 

Kagoshima
Gardens in Kagoshima Prefecture
World Heritage Sites in Japan
Places of Scenic Beauty